Stephanie Cummings is an American politician who served as a Republican member of the Connecticut House of Representatives from the 74th district between January 2017 and January 2021.

Her district covered Waterbury's East End and East Mountain neighbourhoods.

She lost her seat to Democrat Michael DiGiovancarlo in 2020.

References 

Living people
Year of birth missing (living people)
Politicians from Waterbury, Connecticut
21st-century American women politicians
Republican Party members of the Connecticut House of Representatives
Women state legislators in Connecticut
21st-century American politicians